Middle Settlement Lake is a lake located west of Thendara, New York. The outlet creek flows into Middle Branch. Fish species present in the lake are brook trout, and sunfish. There is trail access off Route 28. No motors are allowed on this lake.

References

Lakes of New York (state)
Lakes of Herkimer County, New York